Orro or Ordo is a village in the Nardiganj block of the Nawada district in the Indian state of Bihar. The total population of this village is approximately 10000. Orro is 20 km from the famous pilgrimage town of Rajgir.

Festivals 
Main festival of Orro village is Lakshmi Pooja, Sarasawati Pooja, Ganesh Pooja. A Lakhsmi Mandir was established in 1935 by Dr. Madhusudan Mishra, a social worker and medical practitioner of the village.

Lakshmi Puja
Saraswati Puja 
Ganesh Puja
Chhath
Durga Puja

Education 

In Orro there are various schools such as a primary, middle and a high school. Orro high school, (Now +2, From 2010) is the only high school for neighbouring villages. Orro has been known for its rich educational background for producing great scholars like Pandit Prasidh Narayan Mishra and Pandit Singheswara Mishra.

Transport
The Oro Jagadishpur railway station is situated on Bakhtiyarpur–Tilaiya line under Danapur railway division. It connects Rajgir and Hisua railway station.

References

Villages in Nawada district